Peter and Paul may refer to:

 Saint Peter and Paul the Apostle considered together
 Feast of Saints Peter and Paul, 29 June in the Catholic liturgical calendar
 St. Peter and St. Paul's Church (disambiguation)
 Peter and Paul (film), 1981 television film about the saints
 Peter und Paul, 1990s German television series
 Peter and Paul Fortress, 1703 citadel of St. Petersburg, Russia

See also
 Peter Paul (disambiguation)
 Peter, Paul and Mary